Autosticha guttulata is a moth in the family Autostichidae. It was described by Edward Meyrick in 1925. It is found in China.

References

Moths described in 1925
Autosticha
Moths of Asia